Louis Delorme (December 29, 1824 – June 18, 1895) was a Quebec lawyer and political figure. He represented St. Hyacinthe in the House of Commons of Canada as a Liberal member from 1870 to 1878.

Early life
He was born in Montreal in 1824, the son of Pierre Delorme and Elizabeth Burke, and was educated at Saint Sulpice College and the College of St. Hyacinthe.

Career and education
He studied law and was called to the bar in 1847. Delorme was first elected to the federal parliament in an 1870 by-election held after the death of Alexandre-Édouard Kierzkowski. He was mayor of St. Hyacinthe and warden for the county of St. Hyacinthe. Delorme also served as director for the Bank of St. Hyacinthe. He was named clerk for the Legislative Assembly of Quebec on June 1, 1879.

Personal life
Delorme was married twice. He married Marie-Julie-Anna Fortier in 1855 and Flora-Sara-Adile Paradis in 1871.

Death
He died in Montreal at the age of 70.

Electoral record

References 

1824 births
1870 deaths
Liberal Party of Canada MPs
Members of the House of Commons of Canada from Quebec
Mayors of places in Quebec
Lawyers in Quebec